Lord Chaos, in comics, may refer to:

 Lord Chaos (DC Comics), a DC Comics character from a future timeline, the son of Donna Troy and Terry Long
 Lord Chaos (Marvel Comics), a Marvel Comics cosmic entity